Henry Dudley may refer to:

Henry C. Dudley (1813–1894), English-born North American architect
Henry Dudley (conspirator) (1517–1568), English conspirator
Sir Henry Dudley, 1st Baronet (1745–1824), English minister, magistrate and playwright
Henry Dudley (1531–1557), English soldier and brother of Queen Elizabeth I's favourite, Robert Dudley, Earl of Leicester

See also
Henry Dudley Ryder, clergyman
Henry Dudley Ryder, 4th Earl of Harrowby, British peer